The Macready Theatre is a professional theatre on Lawrence Sheriff Street in the town centre of Rugby, Warwickshire, it is owned by Rugby School.

The theatre is housed in an old Victorian building which dates from 1885 which was originally built as classrooms for Rugby School. In 1975 it was converted into a theatre, named after the actor and former Rugby School pupil William Charles Macready (1793–1873). The theatre was however not opened up to the public until December 2018. The theatre intends to give away one third of its tickets to local school groups for free, in response to cuts made to arts teaching in state schools.

The theatre has 250 seats, and was fitted with a lift for people with disabilities, and is complete with a bar and foyer.

See also
Rugby Theatre

References

External links
Official website

Buildings and structures in Rugby, Warwickshire
Theatres in Warwickshire